Breznakia pachnodae is a Gram-positive and obligately anaerobic bacterium from the genus of Breznakia which has been isolated from the gut of the insect larva Pachnoda ephippiata in Germany.

References

Erysipelotrichia
Bacteria described in 2016